Volxemia is a genus of beetles in the family Cerambycidae, containing the following species:

 Volxemia dianella Lameere, 1884
 Volxemia seabrai Zajciw, 1968

References

Eburiini